Requiem for a Heavyweight is a 1962 American film directed by Ralph Nelson based on the television play of the same name with Anthony Quinn in the role originated by Jack Palance, Jackie Gleason and Mickey Rooney in the parts portrayed on television by Keenan Wynn and his father Ed Wynn, and social worker Grace Miller was portrayed by Julie Harris.

Muhammad Ali, then known as Cassius Clay, appears as Quinn's opponent in a boxing match at the beginning of the movie, a memorable sequence filmed with the camera providing Quinn's point of view as the unstoppable Clay rapidly punches directly at the movie audience with breath-taking speed. Afterward, Maish (Gleason) is confronted by bookies who threaten his life.  If he fails to repay them for their losses, based upon the sure thing bet (he urged them to wager upon) that his fighter, Mountain, would go down in a certain round of the match.  Maish's deal with them had been that they should deduct from their winnings (due to their betting against Mountain, as Maish had advised them to).  The vast sums of losses that Maish's betting (and losing) had run up with them.

The film version is somewhat darker in its plotline than the original teleplay.

Plot 
Mountain Rivera (Quinn) is to interview for a counselor position at a children's camp, arranged by Grace Miller, but Maish, hoping that Mountain will forget about the job interview, takes him to a bar, where they both get drunk. Army (Rooney) arrives at the bar to remind Mountain about the appointment, but Rivera embarrasses himself at the hotel where the interview is to take place, behaving drunkenly in plain sight of the camp owners. After this episode, Grace confronts Maish in tears, condemning him for controlling Mountain and ruining his chance to make a new life for himself.

In the film version, Maish responds forcefully and eloquently to Grace Miller's accusation that he's been over-controlling of Rivera, cares nothing for him, for his best interest or for his future. He tells Grace that she must stop daydreaming and recognize that her idealized conception of Louis Rivera is as false and damaging to Rivera as is Maish's alleged mediocre management of Rivera's pro boxing career, and that her so-called "vision" for Rivera's post-boxing future as a counselor at a children's summer camp is as naïve and pathetic as it is improbable.

To pay off Maish's gambling debts, Mountain agrees to perform as Native American wrestling persona "Big Chief Mountain Rivera." Just prior to entering the ring for his first match, an overwhelming tide of humiliation sweeps over Mountain, causing him to change his mind. Maish blurts out that he bet against Mountain in the fight against Clay, and as Rivera attempts to leave the locker room, "Ma" Greeny and her thugs enter, threatening Maish. However, Mountain changes his mind and agrees to wrestle, thereby allowing "Ma" to be paid and saving Maish's life. In the epic final scene of the film, Mountain enters the ring amidst jeering ridicule to face "Haystacks Calhoun", a grappler from Arkansas billed at 601 lbs.

Cast
 Anthony Quinn as Luis "Mountain" Rivera
 Jackie Gleason as Maish Rennick
 Mickey Rooney as Army
 Julie Harris as Grace Miller
 Stanley Adams as Perelli (as Stan Adams)
 Madame Spivy as Ma Greeny
 Cassius Clay as himself 
 Val Avery as Young fighter's promoter
 Herbie Faye as Charlie, the Bartender
 Jack Dempsey as himself
 Haystack Calhoun as himself

Reception 
The film was met with positive reviews upon its release. Rotten Tomatoes gives it a rating of 89% from a sample of 46 critics with the consensus: "Requiem for a Heavyweight is a stirring character study of a battered boxer that may at times pummel its message yet retains cinematic métier and human nobility."

References

External links 
 
 Requiem for a Heavyweight (1962 film) at Rotten Tomatoes

1962 films
1962 drama films
1960s sports drama films
American sports drama films
American black-and-white films
Boxing mass media
American boxing films
Films based on television plays
Films directed by Ralph Nelson
Films set in New York City
Films about gambling
Cultural depictions of Muhammad Ali
Professional wrestling films
Films with screenplays by Rod Serling
Columbia Pictures films
Films scored by Laurence Rosenthal
Films about summer camps
1962 directorial debut films
1960s English-language films
1960s American films